Shosheltsy is a rural locality (a settlement) in Boretskoye Rural Settlement of Vinogradovsky District, Arkhangelsk Oblast, Russia. The population was 75 as of 2010.

Geography 
Shosheltsy is located on the Nizhnyaya Toyma River, 189 km southeast of Bereznik (the district's administrative centre) by road. Georgiyevskaya is the nearest rural locality.

References 

Rural localities in Vinogradovsky District